Doncaster Pride is South Yorkshire's biggest Gay Pride event, held annually in Doncaster, England, usually in August. It was first held in 2007. Currently the audience figures for the day's event is close to 20,000. The Patron of Doncaster Pride is Sheridan Smith.

Doncaster Pride has been held at the Keepmoat Stadium, the racecourse, and is currently held at Doncaster's Sir Nigel Gresley Square. The event is funded by local businesses, award foundations, various charitable organizations and donations from the public. The event includes a variety of activities for all ages, two stages and a float parade through the town.

History 
The first event was put together in just 3 months in 2007 and attracted more than 1,000 people, on a budget of £15,000. The following year drew a crowd of up to 8,000 people. 

Doncaster Pride 2018 saw over 3,000 people in the Parade through the town, before the free 8 hours of entertainment on two stages.

The event was cancelled in 2020 and 2021 due to the COVID-19 pandemic. The event returned in person in 2022, with Stephanie Hirst headlining it. 2022 also saw the event expand accessibility, hiring sign language interpreters, creation of quiet spaces, and expanasion of facilities for disabled attendees.

References

External links
Doncaster Pride
 https://www.thestar.co.uk/news/pictures-and-video-colourful-carnival-atmosphere-at-the-12th-annual-doncaster-pride-1-9308907

LGBT organisations in England
Pride parades in England
Festivals in South Yorkshire
Doncaster